Ritz-Carlton Kuala Lumpur is a luxury hotel in Kuala Lumpur, Malaysia. It opened on December 1, 1997, and contains 365 guest rooms. US President Barack Obama stayed there in his visit in April 2014.

References

Kuala Lumpur
1997 establishments in Malaysia
Hotels established in 1997
Hotel buildings completed in 1997
Skyscraper hotels in Kuala Lumpur